A Matter of Convenience is a 1987 Australian television film about a couple living in Melbourne. Velma (Deborra-Lee Furness) works in a butchers and wants a baby, but has no money.  Her work shy partner Joe (John Clarke) is resistant to any kind of job. After meeting Alphonse Torontoa, a Frenchman who arranges weddings for immigrants looking to stay in Australia, Velma becomes a witness to these marriages of convenience. After Joe's rejection of a job in the local chicken factory, she forces him to marry an immigrant bride for money.

Joe marries a Lebanese woman but is forced to live with her because the officials become suspicious of Alphonse's arranged marriages. This separates Joe from Velma, causing strain to their relationship.  Joe falls in love with the Lebanese woman, and things spiral out of control.

Ben Lewin won an AACTA Award for Best Direction in Television.

Plot
Valm wants a baby with her partner Joe but he has trouble sustaining himself financially. She agrees to help Alphonse and to marry an immigrant.

Production
It was one of a series of TV movies that were made as a part of a co production deal between Revcom and ABC. Three were to be made in Australia, three in Europe with Australians; the common theme was to be "sentiment". (The other Australian movies were The Lizard King and Perhaps Love.)

References

External links

A Matter of Convenience at AustLit

Australian television films
1987 television films
1987 films
1980s English-language films